The Spanish Navy or officially, the Armada, is the maritime branch of the Spanish Armed Forces and one of the oldest active naval forces in the world. The Spanish Navy was responsible for a number of major historic achievements in navigation, the most famous being the discovery of America and the first global circumnavigation by Elcano. For several centuries, it played a crucial logistical role in the expansion and consolidation of the Spanish Empire, and defended a vast trade network across the Atlantic Ocean between the Americas and Europe, and the Manila Galleon across the Pacific Ocean between the Philippines and the Americas.

The Spanish Navy was the most powerful maritime force in the world from the late 15th century to the early 18th century. In the early 19th century, with the loss of most of its empire, Spain transitioned to a smaller fleet but maintained a major shipbuilding industry which produced important technical innovations. The Spanish Navy built and operated the first military submarines, made important contributions in the development of destroyer warships, and again achieved a first global circumnavigation, this time by an ironclad vessel.

The main bases of the Spanish Navy are at Rota, Ferrol, San Fernando and Cartagena.

History

Origins: the Middle Ages

The roots of the modern Spanish navy date back to before the unification of Spain. By the late Middle Ages, the two principal kingdoms that would later combine to form Spain, Aragon and Castile, had developed powerful fleets. Aragon possessed the third largest navy in the late medieval Mediterranean, although its capabilities were exceeded by those of Venice and (until overtaken in the 15th century by those of Aragon) Genoa. In the 14th and 15th centuries, these naval capabilities enabled Aragon to assemble the largest collection of territories of any European power in the Mediterranean, encompassing the Balearics, Sardinia, Sicily, southern Italy and, briefly, the Duchy of Athens.

Castile meanwhile used its naval capacities to conduct its Reconquista operations against the Moors, capturing Cádiz in 1232 and also to help the French Crown against England in the Hundred Years' War. In 1375, a Castilian fleet destroyed a large English fleet at Bourgneuf, and Castilian ships raided the English coast. As Castile developed long-lasting trade relationships with towns in the Low Countries of the Netherlands and Flanders, the English Channel virtually became the "Spanish Channel." In 1402, a Castilian expedition led by Juan de Bethencourt conquered the Canary Islands for Henry III of Castile. In 1419, the Castilians defeated the German Hanseatic League at sea and excluded them from the Bay of Biscay.

In the 15th century, Castile entered into a race of exploration with Portugal, the country that inaugurated the European Age of Discovery. In 1492, two caravels and a carrack, commanded by Christopher Columbus, arrived in America, on an expedition that sought a westward oceanic passage across the Atlantic, to the Far East. This began the era of trans-oceanic trade routes, pioneered by the Spanish in the seas to the west of Europe and the Portuguese to the east.

The Habsburg era

Following the discovery of America and the settlement of certain Caribbean islands, such as Cuba, Spanish conquistadors Hernán Cortés and Francisco Pizarro were carried by the Spanish navy to the mainland, where they conquered Mexico and Peru respectively. The navy also carried explorers to the North American mainland, including Juan Ponce de León and Álvarez de Pineda, who discovered Florida (1519) and Texas (1521) respectively. In 1519, Spain sent out the first expedition of world circumnavigation in history, which was put in the charge of the Portuguese Commander Ferdinand Magellan. Following the death of Magellan in the Philippines, the expedition was completed under the command of Juan Sebastián Elcano in 1522. In 1565, a follow-on expedition by Miguel López de Legazpi was carried by the navy from New Spain (Mexico) to the Philippines via Guam to establish the Spanish East Indies, a base for trade with the Orient. For two and a half centuries, the Manila galleons operated across the Pacific linking Manila and Acapulco. Until the early 17th century, the Pacific Ocean was dominated by the Spanish Navy. Aside from the Marianas and Caroline Islands, several naval expeditions also discovered the Tuvalu archipelago, the Marquesas, the Solomon Islands and New Guinea in the South Pacific. In the quest for Terra Australis, Spanish explorers in the 17th century also discovered the Pitcairn and Vanuatu archipelagos. Most significantly, from 1565 Spanish fleets explored and colonised the Philippine archipelago, the Spanish East Indies.

After the unification of its kingdoms under the House of Habsburg, Spain maintained two largely separate fleets, one consisting chiefly of galleys for use in the Mediterranean and the other of sailing ships for the Atlantic, successors to the Aragonese and Castilian navies respectively. This arrangement continued until superseded by the decline of galley warfare during the 17th century. The completion of the Reconquista with the conquest of the Kingdom of Granada in 1492 had been followed by naval expansion in the Mediterranean, where Spain seized control of almost every significant port along the coast of North Africa west of Cyrenaica, notably Melilla (captured 1497), Mers El Kébir (1505), Oran (1509), Algiers (1510) and Tripoli (1510), which marked the furthest point of this advance. However, the hinterlands of these ports remained under the control of their Muslim and Berber inhabitants, and the expanding naval power of the Ottoman Empire brought about a major Islamic counter-offensive, which embroiled Spain in decades of intense warfare for control of the western Mediterranean. (Algiers and Tripoli would be lost to the Ottomans later in the 16th century.)
From the 1570s, the lengthy Dutch Revolt increasingly challenged Spanish sea power, producing powerful rebel naval forces that attacked Spanish shipping and in time made Spain's sea communications with its possessions in the Low Countries difficult. Most notable of these attacks was the Battle of Gibraltar in 1607, in which a Dutch squadron destroyed a fleet of galleons at anchor in the confines of the bay. This naval war took on a global dimension with actions in the Caribbean and the Far East, notably around the Philippines. Spain's response to its problems included the encouragement of privateers based in the Spanish Netherlands and known from their main base as Dunkirkers, who preyed on Dutch merchant ships and fishing trawlers.

At the Battle of Lepanto (1571), the Holy League, formed by Spain, Venice, the Papal States and other Christian allies, inflicted a great defeat on the Ottoman Navy, stopping Muslim forces from gaining uncontested control of the Mediterranean.

In the 1580s, the conflict in the Netherlands drew England into war with Spain, creating a further menace to Spanish shipping. The effort to neutralise this threat led to a disastrous attempt to invade England in 1588, however, the disaster of the English Armada the following year managed to return the balance between the belligerents. The defeat of 1588 led to a reform of fleet operations. The navy at this time was not a single operation but consisted of various fleets, made up mainly of armed merchantmen with escorts of royal ships. The Armada fiasco marked a turning point in naval warfare, where gunnery was now more important than ramming and boarding and so Spanish ships were equipped with purpose built naval guns. During the 1590s, the expansion of these fleets allowed a great increase in overseas trade and a massive increase in the importation of luxuries and silver. Nevertheless, inadequate port defences allowed an Anglo-Dutch force to raid Cadiz in 1596, and though unsuccessful in its objective of capturing the silver from the just returned convoy, was able to inflict great damage upon the city. Port defences at Cadiz were upgraded and all attempts to repeat the attack in the following centuries would fail.

Meanwhile, Spanish ships were able to step up operations in the English Channel, the North Sea and towards Ireland. They were able to capture many enemy ships, merchant and military, in the early decades of the 17th century and provide military supplies to Spanish armies in France and the Low Countries and to Irish rebels in Ireland. In 1639, however, a Dutch fleet under Maarten Tromp decisively defeated a large Spanish fleet in the Battle of the Downs and put an end to Spanish opertations in Northen waters.

By the middle of the 17th century, Spain had been drained by the vast strains of the Thirty Years' and related wars and began to slip into a slow decline. During the middle to late decades of the century, the Dutch, English and French were able to take advantage of Spain's shrinking, run-down and increasingly underequipped fleets. Military priorities in continental Europe meant that naval affairs were increasingly neglected. The Dutch took control of the smaller islands of the Caribbean, while England conquered Jamaica and France the western part of Santo Domingo. These territories became bases for raids on Spanish New World ports and shipping by pirates and privateers. The Spanish concentrated their efforts in keeping the most important islands, such as Cuba, Puerto Rico and the majority of Santo Domingo, while the system of treasure fleets, despite being greatly diminished, was rarely defeated in safely conveying its freight of silver and Asian luxuries across the Atlantic to Europe. Only two such convoys were ever lost to enemy action with their cargo, one to a Dutch fleet in 1628 and another to an English fleet in 1656. A third convoy was destroyed at anchor by another English attack in 1657, but it had already unloaded its treasure.

By the time of the wars of the Grand Alliance (1688–97) and the Spanish Succession (1702–14), the Habsburg regime had decided that it was more cost effective to rely on allied fleets, Anglo-Dutch and French respectively, than to invest in its own fleets.

The Bourbon era
The War of the Spanish Succession arose after the establishment on the Spanish throne of a House of Bourbon king, following the extinction of the Spanish Habsburg line. The internal division between supporters of a Habsburg and those of a Bourbon king led to a civil war and ultimately to the loss of Sicily, Sardinia, Menorca and Gibraltar. Gibraltar and Menorca were captured by Anglo-Dutch forces fighting under the Spanish flag of Habsburg contender Charles VI. Menorca was ultimately surrendered to Spain years later. At the end of the War of Spanish Succession, Spain's possessions in the Low countries and mainland Italy were ceded to Austria.

Attempting to reverse the losses of the previous war, in the War of the Quadruple Alliance (1718–20) the Spanish navy successfully convoyed armies to invade Sicily and Sardinia, but the poorly maintained escort fleet was destroyed by the British in the Battle of Cape Passaro and the Spanish invasion army was defeated in Italy by the Austrians. A major program to renovate and reorganise the run-down navy was begun. A secretaría (ministry) of the army and navy had been established by the Bourbon regime as early as 1714; which centralized the command and administration of the different fleets. Following the war of Quadruple Alliance, a program of rigorous standardization was introduced in ships, operations, and administration. Given the needs of its empire, Spanish warship designs tended to be more orientated towards long-range escort and patrol duties than for battle. A major reform of the Spanish navy was initiated, updating its ships and administration, which was helped by French and Italian experts, although Spaniards, most notably Antonio Castaneta, soon rose to prominence in this work, which made Spain a leader in warship design and quality again, as was demonstrated by ships like the Princesa. A major naval yard was established at Havana, enabling the navy to maintain a permanent force in the Americas for the defence of the colonies and the suppression of piracy and smuggling. In metropolitan Spain, significant forest reconnaissance operations were regularly undertaken by Spanish naval officers to seek out sources of timber suitable for shipbuilding.

During the War of the Polish Succession (1733–38), a renewed attempt to regain the lost Italian territories for the Bourbon dynasty was successful; with the French as allies and the British and Dutch neutral, Spain launched a campaign by sea and retook Sicily and southern Italy from Austria. In the War of Jenkins' Ear, the navy showed it was able to maintain communications with the American colonies and resupply Spanish forces in Italy in the face of British naval opposition. The navy played an important part in the decisive Battle of Cartagena de Indias in modern-day Colombia, where a massive British invasion fleet and army were defeated by a smaller Spanish force commanded by able strategist Blas de Lezo. This Spanish victory prolonged Spain's supremacy in the Americas until the early 19th century. The program of naval renovation was continued and by the 1750s the Spanish navy had outstripped the Dutch to become the third most powerful in the world, behind only those of Britain and France.

Joining France against Britain near the end of the Seven Years' War (1756–63), the navy failed to prevent the British capturing Havana, during which the Spanish squadron present was also captured. In the American War of Independence (1775–83), the Spanish navy was essential to the establishment, in combination with the French and Dutch navies, of a numerical advantage that stretched British naval resources. They played a vital role, along with the French and Dutch, in maintaining military supplies to the American rebels. The navy also played a key role in the Spanish army led operations that defeated the British in Florida. The bulk of the purely naval combat on the allied side fell to the French navy, although Spain achieved lucrative successes with the capture of two great British convoys meant for the resupply of British forces and loyalists in North America. Joint operations with France resulted in the capture of Menorca but failed in the siege of Gibraltar.

Having initially opposed France in the French Revolutionary Wars (1792–1802), Spain changed sides in 1796, but defeat by the British a few months later in the Battle of Cape St. Vincent (1797) and Trinidad (1798) was followed by the blockade of the main Spanish fleet in Cadiz. The run down of naval operations had as much to do with the confused political situation in Spain as it had to do with the blockade. The British blockade of Spain's ports was of limited success and an attempt to attack Cadiz was defeated; ships on special missions and convoys successfully evaded the Cadiz blockade and other ports continued to operate with little difficulty, but the main battle fleets were largely inactive. The blockade was lifted with the Peace of Amiens 1802. The war recommenced in 1804 and ended in 1808 when the Spain and the United Kingdom became allied against Napoleon. As in the first part, Cadiz was blockaded and Spanish naval activity was minimal. The most notable event was Spanish involvement in the Battle of Trafalgar under French leadership. This resulted in the Spanish navy losing eleven ships-of-the-line or over a quarter of its line-of-battle ships. After Spain became allied with the United Kingdom in 1808 in its war of independence, the Spanish navy joined the war effort against Napoleon.

The 19th century

The 1820s saw the loss of most of the Spanish Empire in the Americas. With the empire greatly reduced in size and Spain divided and unstable after its own war of independence, the navy lost its importance and shrank greatly.

The first new steam-driven vessel (Isabel II) was purchased from the United Kingdom in 1834.

However, in the 1850s and 1860s, particularly under the prime-ministership of General O'Donnell, significant investments were made in the Spanish naval squadrons of the Pacific.  A new steam-powered naval squadron sailed around the Pacific escorting a Spanish scientific expedition and unfortunately became entangled in what has been billed the First War of the Pacific from 1864 to 1871.  During the conflict, the Spanish massed a fleet of 15 vessels to combat the combined navies of Peru, Chile, and Ecuador.

The 1890s saw the Spanish Navy gain several armored cruisers—important for maintaining connection with the Spanish Empire's remaining colonies—including the Emperador Carlos V. As of 1896, according to the plans of Admiral José María Beránger, there were three naval divisions based at Cadiz, Ferrol, and Cartagena. Each division was composed of ironclads, in addition to auxiliary squadrons for defense of the Spanish coastline. That year the Armada consisted of one battleship, eight cruisers of the first class, six of the second class, and nine of the third class, as well as 38 torpedo craft. There were an additional ten vessels under construction. As of 1896 there were 1,002 officers in the navy, along with 725 mechanics, 14,000 sailors, and 9,000 marines. Their numbers were maintained by conscription of the seafaring population.

During the Spanish–American War in 1898, a badly supported and equipped Spanish fleet of four armored cruisers and two destroyers was overwhelmed by numerically and technically superior forces (three new battleships, one new second class battleship, and one large armored cruiser) as it tried to break out of an American blockade in the Battle of Santiago de Cuba. Admiral Cervera's squadron was overrun in an attempt to break a powerful American blockade off Cuba. In the Philippines, a squadron, made up of aging ships, including some obsolete cruisers, had already been sacrificed in a token gesture in Manila Bay.  The Battle of Manila Bay took place on 1 May 1898, during the Spanish–American War. The American Asiatic Squadron under Commodore George Dewey engaged and destroyed the Spanish Pacific Squadron under Admiral Patricio Montojo y Pasarón. The engagement took place in Manila Bay in the Philippines, and was the first major engagement of the Spanish–American War. This war marked the end for the Spanish Navy as a global maritime force.

At the end of the 19th century, the Spanish Navy adopted the Salve Marinera, a hymn to the Virgin Mary as Stella Maris, as its official anthem.

The 20th and 21st centuries

During the Rif War in Morocco, the Spanish navy conducted operations along the coast, including the Alhucemas landing in 1925, the first air-naval landing of the world. At that time, the Navy developed a Naval Aviation branch, the Aeronáutica naval.

The Spanish Republic and Spanish Civil War

In 1931, following the proclamation of the Second Spanish Republic, the Navy of the Spanish Kingdom became the Spanish Republican Navy. Admiral Aznar's casual comment: "Do you think it was a little thing what happened yesterday, that Spain went to bed as a monarchy and rose as a republic" became instantly famous, going quickly around Madrid and around Spain, making people accept the fact and setting a more relaxed mood. The Spanish Republican Navy introduced a few changes in the flags and ensigns, as well as in the navy officer rank insignia. The executive curl (La coca) was replaced by a golden five-pointed star and the royal crown of the brass buttons and of the officers' breastplates (La gola) became a mural crown.

The Spanish Republican Navy became divided after the coup of July 1936 that led to the Spanish Civil War (1936–39). The fleet's two small dreadnoughts, one heavy cruiser, one large destroyer and half a dozen submarines and auxiliary vessels were lost in the course of the conflict.

World War II
Like the rest of the Spanish armed forces, the Spanish Navy maintained Franco's policy of neutrality during World War II.

Post World War II

Since the mid-20th century, the Spanish Navy began a process of reorganization to once again become one of the major navies of the world. After the development of the s based on the US Navy's , the Spanish Navy embraced the American naval doctrine. Spain became a member of NATO in 1982 and the Armada Española has taken part in many coalition peacekeeping operations, from SFOR to Haiti and other locations around the world. Today's Armada is a modern navy with a carrier group, a modern strategic amphibious ship (which replaced a dedicated aircraft carrier in 2011), modern frigates (F-100 class) with the Aegis Combat System, F-80-class frigates, minesweepers, new s, amphibious ships and various other ships, including oceanographic research ships.

The Armada's special operations and unconventional warfare capability is embodied in the Naval Special Warfare Command (Mando de Guerra Naval Especial), which is under the direct control of the Admiral of the Fleet.  The unit in charge of special operations is the Naval Special Warfare Force (Fuerza de Guerra Naval Especial), which is a merge of the previous Special Operations Unit (Unidad de Operaciones Especiales (UOE)) and the Special Combat Diver Unit (Unidad Especial de Buceadores de Combate (UEBC)). This unit is trained in maritime counter-terrorism, specialized combat diving and swimming, coastal infiltration, ship boarding, direct action, special reconnaissance, hydrographic reconnaissance and underwater demolitions.

Armada officers receive their education at the Spanish Naval Academy (ENM). They are recruited through two different methods:
 Militar de Complemento: Similar to the U.S. ROTC program, students are college graduates who enroll in the navy. They spend a year at the Naval Academy and then are commissioned as ensigns and Marine second lieutenants. This path is growing in prestige. Their career stops at the rank of commander (for the Navy) and for the Marines, lieutenant colonel.
 Militar de Carrera: Students spend one year in the Naval Academy if they apply to the Supply Branch or the Engineering Branch, and five years if they apply as General Branch or Marines, receiving a university degree-equivalent upon graduation and being commissioned as ensigns and Marine second lieutenants.

Current status

Subordinate to the Spanish Chief of Naval Staff, stationed in Madrid, are four area commands: the Cantabrian Maritime Zone with its headquarters at Ferrol on the Atlantic coast; the Straits Maritime Zone with its headquarters at San Fernando near Cadiz; the Mediterranean Maritime Zone with its headquarters at Cartagena; and the Canary Islands Maritime Zone with its headquarters at Las Palmas de Gran Canaria. Operational naval units are classified by mission and assigned to either the combat forces, the protective forces, or the auxiliary forces. Combat forces are given the tasks of conducting offensive and defensive operations against potential enemies and for assuring maritime communications. Their principal vessels include a carrier group, naval aircraft, transports, landing vessels, submarines, and missile-armed fast attack craft. Protective forces have the mission of securing maritime communications over both ocean and coastal routes, securing the approaches to ports and maritime terminals. Their principal components are frigates, corvettes, and minesweepers. It also has marine units for the defense of naval installations. Auxiliary forces are responsible for transportation and provisioning at sea and has diverse tasks like coast guard operations, scientific work, and maintenance of training vessels. In addition to supply ships and tankers, the force included destroyers and a large number of patrol craft.

Until February 2013, when it was decommissioned because of budget cuts, the second largest vessel of the Armada was the aircraft carrier Principe de Asturias, which entered service in 1988 after completing sea trials. Built in Spain, it was designed with a "ski-jump" takeoff deck. Its complement was 29 AV-8 Harrier II vertical (or short) takeoff and landing (V/STOL) aircraft or 16 helicopters designed for antisubmarine warfare and to support marine landings.

, the Armada has a strength of 20,800 personnel.

Infantería de Marina

The Infantería de Marina is the marine infantry of the Spanish Navy, and the oldest marine corps in existence in the world. It has a strength of 11,500 troops and is divided into base defense forces and landing forces. One of the three base defense battalions is stationed with each of the Navy headquarters. "Groups" (midway between battalions and regiments) are stationed in Madrid and Las Palmas de Gran Canaria. The Tercio (fleet — regiment equivalent) is available for immediate embarkation and based out of San Fernando. Its principal weapons include light tanks, armored personnel vehicles, self-propelled artillery, and TOW and Dragon antitank missiles.

Equipment

Ships and submarines

As of 2018, there are approximately 138 vessels in service within the Navy, including minor auxiliary vessels. A breakdown includes an amphibious assault ship (also used as an aircraft carrier), amphibious transport docks, frigates, submarines, mine countermeasure vessels, patrol vessels and a number of auxiliary ships. The total displacement of the Spanish Navy is approximately 220,000 tonnes.

Aircraft

The Spanish Naval Air Arm constitutes the naval aviation branch of the Spanish Navy.

|-
| McDonnell Douglas AV-8B Harrier II
| UK
| Jet
| Multi-role
| 1987
| 
| 13
| 
|-
| Cessna Citation
| USA
| Jet
| Utility
| 
| 
| 4
| 
|-
| NHI NH90
| Europe
| Rotorcraft
| Utility
| 2021
| NH-90 TTH
| 
| 7 on order
|-
| Airbus Helicopters H135
| Europe
| Rotorcraft
| Trainer
| 2023
| H135
| 
| 7 on order
|-
| Agusta-Bell AB 212
| Italy
| Rotorcraft
| Utility
| 1974
| 
| 7
| 
|-
| Hughes 500M
| USA
| Rotorcraft
| Trainer
| 1972
| 
| 6
| 
|-
| Sikorsky SH-60 Seahawk
| USA
| Rotorcraft
| ASW
| 1988
| SH-60B
| 12
|
|-
| Sikorsky SH-60 Seahawk
| USA
| Rotorcraft
| Transport
| 2020
| SH-60F
| 6
| ex-US Navy 
|}

Ranks and insignia

The officer ranks of the Spanish Navy are as follows below, (for a comparison with other NATO ranks, see Ranks and Insignia of NATO). Midshipmen are further divided into 1st and 2nd Classes and Officer Cadets 3rd and 4th Classes respectively.

Officers

Enlisted

The article Spanish Marine Infantry includes the rank insignia descriptions for this part of the Navy.

Organization
The Spanish Navy shares the organization model of its two sister services – the Spanish Army and the Spanish Air and Space Force. Each of them consists of a Headquarters (Cuartel general), a Force (Fuerza, composed of the operational units) and a Force Support (Apoyo a la fuerza, composed of administration, logistical and training units). For historical traditions the Force of the Spanish Navy is called Fleet (Flota) and the two terms are used interchangeably. At the head of the Navy is an Almirante general (a four-star rank reserved for the Chief of the Spanish Navy and the Chief of the Spanish Armed Forces, when the latter position is held by a naval officer), denominated AJEMA or Admiral Chief of the General Staff of the Navy (Almirante Jefe de Estado Mayor de la Armada). Counterintuitive to this official designation he holds authority over all three components of the service and the officer, who actually functions as Chief of Staff is a three-star Almirante, designated Admiral Deputy Chief of the General Staff of the Navy (Almirante Segundo Jefe del Estado Mayor de la Armada or 2º AJEMA)

Admiral Chief of the General Staff of the Navy (AJEMA) 

Navy Headquarters – Admiral Deputy Chief of the General Staff of the Navy (2º AJEMA)  (in Madrid)
General Staff of the Navy
Office of the Admiral Chief of the General Staff of the Navy
Department of General Services, Technical Assistance and Signals and Telecommunication Systems
Naval Cultural and Historical Office
Legal Service of the Navy Headquarters
Central Internal Audit Service of the Navy
Central Maritime (Naval) Tribunal
Fleet – Admiral of the Fleet (ALFLOT) 
 Fleet Command (Mando de la Flota, in the "Almirante Rodríguez Martín-Granizo" Complex at Rota Naval Base)
Naval Action Force – Admiral of Naval Action (ALNAV)  (at the La Graña Naval Station, Ferrol)
Naval Action Group 1  (at the La Graña Naval Station, Ferrol)
31st Escort Squadron (at Ferrol)
 5 AEGIS Frigates. 6,250 tons.
41st Escort Squadron (at Rota Naval Base)
6 Frigates. 4,017 tons
1 Replenishment ship  (at Ferrol). 17,045 tons
1 Replenishment ship  (at Ferrol). 19,500 tons
Naval Action Group 2  (at Rota Naval Base)
1 LHD . 27,079 Tons.
2 LPD s. 13,818 tons
Beachmaster Group, including LCM-1E landing craft
Naval Maritime Force – Admiral of Maritime Action (ALMART) , at Cartagena Naval Arsenal
Canary Islands Naval Command – Admiral of the Canary Islands (ALCANAR) , at Las Palmas de Gran Canaria Naval Arsenal)
Canary Patrol Craft Unit
Canary Diving Unit
support units
Naval Commandancy of Santa Cruz de Tenerife
Naval Commandancy of Las Palmas de Gran Canaria
Cádiz Naval Action Command – Naval Commandant of Cádiz, at Puntales Naval Station, Cádiz
Alborán Naval Detachment (of patrol craft and tow boats)
Cádiz Diving Unit
Naval Commandancy of Cádiz
Ferrol Naval Action Command – Naval Commandant of Ferrol, at Ferrol Naval Base
Ferrol Naval Detachment
Ferrol Diving Unit
Naval Commandancy of Ferrol
Cartagena Naval Action Command – Naval Commandant of Cartagena, at Cartagena Naval Arsenal
Cartagena Naval Detachment
Naval Commandancy of Cartagena
Balearic Islands Naval Sector – Naval Commandant of the Balearic Islands, at Porto Pi Naval Station, Palma de Mallorca
Naval Commandancy of Palma
Naval Commandancy of Mahón
Naval Commandancy of Ibiza
Mine Counter-Measures Force – Commandant of the MCM Force, at the Cartagena Naval Arsenal
MCM command ship Diana
1st MCM Squadron – 6 Minehunters M-30. 585 tons
MCM Diving Unit
Support Force
Naval Diving Center, at Algameca Naval Station, Cartagena
Sector Naval de Baleares
Marine Infantry Force – Commandant General of Naval Infantry (COMGEIM) , at San Fernando, Cádiz
Naval Expeditionary Force (Tercio de la Armada (TEAR))
Naval Infantry Brigade (BIM) , at San Fernando, Cádiz
Protection Force (Fuerza de Protección)
Marine Infantry Madrid Detachment (Agrupación de Infantería de Marina de Madrid (AGRUMAD)) – Naval HQ security unit
Northern Battalion (Tercio del Norte (TERNOR)) – Nuestra Señora de los Dolores Barracks, Ferrol
Southern Battalion (Tercio del Sur (TERSUR)) – San Fernando and Rota Naval Base
Eastern Battalion (Tercio de Levante (TERLEV)) – Cartagena Naval Arsenal
Security Unit of the Canary Islands Naval Command (Unidad de Seguridad del Mando Naval de Canarias (USCAN)) – Las Palmas
  Naval Special Warfare Force(FGNE) , at Algameca Naval Station, Cartagena
Submarine Flotilla (FLOSUB), at Cartagena Naval Arsenal
 Flotilla Command
3 Submarines S-70 Galerna. 1,740 tons
 4 AIP submarines. (Under construction) 3,426 tons
Submarine Base
Training Section
Tactical Submarine Programs Center
Aircraft Flotilla (FLOAN), at Rota Naval Base
Flotilla Command
3rd Flying Squadron – Agusta-Bell 212
4th Flying Squadron – Cessna Citation liaison aircraft
5th Flying Squadron – Sikorsky SH-3D Sea King
6th Flying Squadron – Hughes 500MD
9th Flying Squadron – McDonnell Douglas AV/TAV-8B+ Harrier II
10th Flying Squadron – Sikorsky SH-60B/F Seahawk
11th Flying Squadron – Boeing Insitu ScanEagle
Carrier Air Group – aircraft detached from the flying squadrons
Simulation Center
Aircraft Maintenance Center
General Support Units
 Force Support
Department of Personnel – Admiral in Charge of Personnel (AJEPER) , in Cádiz
Logistic Support Department – Admiral in Charge of Logistic Support (AJAL) , in Cádiz
Directorate of Economic Affairs – Director of Economic Affairs, Quartermaster Major General (DEA) , in Madrid
TOTAL Tons Main Vessels: 233,596 Tons

Preserved ships 

Most of the few retired Spanish Navy ships preserved as museum ships are submarines:
 Submarine Peral of 1888 is preserved in Cartagena (Murcia).
 Two units of the Foca class: SA-41 in Mahón (Balearic Islands) and SA-42 in Cartagena (Murcia).
 Two units of the Tiburón class: the SA-51 in Barcelona (Catalonia) and the SA-52 in Cartagena (Murcia).
 Delfín (S-61), of the Daphné class (S-60) is moored in Torrevieja (Province of Alicante, Valencian Community). Unlike the other submarines, it is not anchored on land but moored in the port, thus becoming the first "floating museum" of its kind in Spain.
 The Customs Surveillance Service patrol car Albatros III is also preserved in Torrevieja.
 Galatea, a barque that was a training ship for the Spanish Navy between 1922 and 1982, is preserved in Glasgow (Scotland, United Kingdom).

See also
Salve Marinera
Coats of arms, badges and emblems of Spanish Armed Forces#Navy
List of retired Spanish Navy ships
List of future Spanish Navy ships

Notes

References

External links

Official website 
http://www.todoababor.es (Spanish Naval History)
History of Spanish Mariners
http://www.revistanaval.com
http://www.losbarcosdeeugenio.com/principal_es.html
El Arma Submarina Española (unofficial website)
https://web.archive.org/web/20070514165145/http://www.fotosdebarcos.com/ (Spanish Navy Section, see Armada Española with all kind of Spanish navy ships)
Spanish Navy page on Andrew Toppan's Haze Gray and Underway
Spain Plans to Upgrade Navy's Projection Group
Foro Militar General (unofficial forum)
Warships of the Spanish Civil War
BUQUESDEGUERRA.TK, Spanish website about warships